Fort George was a British fort built in 1778 for the protection of Pensacola, Florida. The Spanish captured it in Siege of Pensacola on May 10, 1781 (American Revolutionary War).

The fort no longer exists, though part of it was later recreated to mark its original location. This reconstruction is part of the Fort George Memorial Park, which is in the North Hill Preservation District. The park is located on La Rua and Palafox Streets.

The site was added to the U.S. National Register of Historic Places on July 8, 1974.

References

External links

Historical Marker Database
 Escambia County listings at National Register of Historic Places
 Escambia County listings at Florida's Office of Cultural and Historical Programs
 The Origins of North Hill at North Hill Preservation Association
 Fort George Park at Pensacola Online.com
 War of 1812
 City Showcase – Pensacola

National Register of Historic Places in Escambia County, Florida
Buildings and structures in Pensacola, Florida
George
George
George
Parks in Escambia County, Florida
Tourist attractions in Pensacola, Florida
George
1778 establishments in the British Empire
American Revolution on the National Register of Historic Places